Early general elections were held in the Netherlands on 29 November 1972. The Labour Party (PvdA) remained the largest party, winning 43 of the 150 seats in the House of Representatives.

The elections led to a five-party coalition government consisting of the PvdA, the Catholic People's Party, the Anti-Revolutionary Party, the Political Party of Radicals and Democrats 1966 with the PvdA's Joop den Uyl as Prime Minister.

Results

References

1972
1972 elections in the Netherlands
November 1972 events in Europe